Staybridge Suites is an all-suite, residential-style brand of hotels within the InterContinental Hotels Group.  The hotels are primarily targeted toward extended-stay and corporate travelers. Over 220 Staybridge Suites hotels are in the United States, Canada, Mexico, Europe and South America.

History
The first Staybridge Suites opened in Alpharetta, Georgia, U.S. in 1998.  In 2004, Staybridge Suites reached 75 hotels with the addition of a location in Eatontown, New Jersey.When the Staybridge Suites Liverpool hotel (owned by Cycas Hospitality) opened in June 2008 it became the brand's first property outside North America and the first of the franchise's properies to debut in Europe.

Awards
In July 2009, Staybridge Suites was named Best in Customer Satisfaction by Market Metrix, LLC for superiority in customer satisfaction among all upscale hotel brands during the first quarter of 2009. In August 2009, Staybridge Suites was ranked highest in the extended-stay segment according to the J.D. Power and Associates 2009 Hotel Guest Satisfaction Study.  Business Travel News rated Staybridge Suites as the top upscale extended stay brand in their 2011 U.S. Hotel Chain Survey.

See also
Staybridge Suites, Savannah

References

External links

 

InterContinental Hotels Group brands
Hotels established in 1997
Extended stay hotel chains